Ghughumari  is a village and a gram panchayat in the Cooch Behar I CD block in the Cooch Behar Sadar subdivision of the Cooch Behar district  in the state of West Bengal, India.

Geography

Location

Area overview
The map alongside shows the north-central part of the district. It has the highest level of urbanisation in an overwhelming rural district. 22.08% of the population of the Cooch Behar Sadar subdivision lives in the urban areas and 77.92% lives in the rural areas. The district forms the flat alluvial flood plains of mighty rivers.
 
Note: The map alongside presents some of the notable locations in the subdivision. All places marked in the map are linked in the larger full screen map.

Civic administration
The headquarters of the Cooch Behar I CD block are located at Ghughumari.

Demographics
As per the 2011 Census of India, Ghughumari had a total population of 13,764.  There were 7,019 (51%) males and 6,745 (49%) females. There were 1,704 persons in the age range of 0 to 6 years. The total number of literate people in Ghughumari was 9,146 (75.84% of the population over 6 years).

Handicrafts
There are about 14,000 families weaving pati or sitalpati in and around Ghughumari. After the partition of Bengal in 1947, a number of families migrated from Tangail, now in Bangladesh, and settled in this area. They brought the age-old tradition of weaving pati and that helped them survive. Generally, men are engaged in growing the plants and extracting the fibre, and the women are engaged in weaving.

References

Villages in Cooch Behar district